The 1982 UEFA Cup Final was played on 5 May 1982 and 19 May 1982 between IFK Göteborg of Sweden and Hamburg of West Germany. IFK won 4–0 on aggregate to win the first major European honour in the club's history.

With this defeat, Hamburg became the first club to have been runner-up in all three major pre-1999 European competitions (European Champion Clubs' Cup/UEFA Champions League, UEFA Cup/UEFA Europa League, and the now-defunct Cup Winners' Cup), having lost the 1968 European Cup Winners' Cup Final and the 1980 European Cup Final.

Route to the final

Match details

First leg

Second leg

See also
1981-82 UEFA Cup
IFK Göteborg in European football

References

RSSSF - UEFA Cup 1981/82
RSSSF - IFK Göteborg in Europe 1981-1995

2
IFK Göteborg matches
Hamburger SV matches
1982
1982 in Swedish football
1982
1982
1981–82 in German football
May 1982 sports events in Europe
1980s in Hamburg
1980s in Gothenburg
International sports competitions in Gothenburg
Sports competitions in Hamburg
1982 in West German sport